Euphorbia thulinii is a species of plant in the family Euphorbiaceae. It is endemic to Somalia, and is threatened by habitat loss.

References

thulinii
Plants described in 1992
Vulnerable plants
Endemic flora of Somalia
Taxonomy articles created by Polbot